Sarah Johnson (born 1980) is a South African poet.

Sarah Johnson was born in Cape Town, and has lived there her entire life. She completed her MA in creative writing at the University of Cape Town, and published her first work, a collection of poetry, in 2004. Personae was described by Stephen Watson as 'one of the best debut volumes in recent years'.

Poetry
 Personae. (University of Cape Town, 2004) review

References

1980 births
Living people
Writers from Cape Town
South African women poets
University of Cape Town alumni
21st-century South African poets